Stig Håkansson (19 October 1918 – 2000) was a Swedish sprinter and long jumper, who won a gold medal in the 4 × 100 m relay at the 1946 European Championships; he finished fifth in the individual 100 m and in the long jump. He won the national titles in the 100 m in 1944 and 1946 and in the long jump in 1939, 1944 and 1945.

He was also known as a curler: he was 1968 Swedish men's curling champion and played for Sweden at the  where Swedish team finished on 4th place. In 1986 he was inducted into the Swedish Curling Hall of Fame.

References

External links

1918 births
2000 deaths
Swedish male sprinters
European Athletics Championships medalists
Swedish male long jumpers
Swedish male curlers
Swedish curling champions
20th-century Swedish people